Balbuena is a surname. Notable people with the surname include:

Agustín Balbuena (born 1945), Argentinian footballer
Bernardo de Balbuena (1561–1627), Spanish poet
Danielle Balbuena (born 1997), American hip hop artist, better known by the stage name 070 Shake
Edgar Balbuena (born 1980), Paraguayan footballer
Fabián Balbuena (born 1991), Paraguayan footballer
Fermín Balbuena (born 1962), Paraguayan footballer and manager
Guillermina López Balbuena (born 1973), Mexican politician
José Balbuena (1917–2009), Peruvian-Chilean footballer
Patricia Balbuena, Peruvian lawyer and public servant

See also 
Balbuena metro station, in Mexico City, Mexico